This is a sub-article to RISC OS.
 filetypes use metadata to distinguish file formats. Some common file formats from other systems are mapped to filetypes by the MimeMap module. Such mapping was previously handled by DosMap.

The MimeMap module maps  filetypes to and from MIME content types, dotted filename extensions and Apple's Uniform Type Identifiers.

Requests for new filetype allocations for all  versions are handled centrally by RISC OS Open.

RISC OS filetypes
Filetypes were originally classified by Acorn into distinct ranges:

User 
This range of filetypes was intended for personal use in closed systems, not for general distribution. Nevertheless, many programs using these types were distributed, especially as Public-domain software. Consequently there are many clashes.

Non-commercial software

Commercial software

Acorn reserved

Generic data

References

External links
 File Types  Programmer's Reference Manuals at RISC OS Open wiki

RISC OS filetypes
RISC OS